The list of National Taiwan University people includes alumni and prominent faculty and staff.

Nobel Prize Laureate
Yuan-Tseh Lee (李遠哲): Chemistry, 1986

Wolf Prize Laureates
Shang Fa Yang(楊祥發): Agriculture, 1991, after whom the Yang cycle is named
Chi-Huey Wong (翁啟惠): Chemistry, 2014; Professor of Chemistry, the Scripps Research Institute; former President of Academia Sinica

Turing Award Laureate
Andrew Yao (姚期智): Turing Award, 2000 (the only ethnic Chinese recipient to date); Professor, Tsinghua University, Beijing

University chancellors
Tien, Chang-lin (田長霖): the 8th Chancellor, University of California, Berkeley
Henry T. Yang (楊祖佑): the 5th Chancellor, University of California, Santa Barbara

Sciences and Engineering
Wu-Chung Hsiang (項武忠): Professor Emeritus of Mathematics, Princeton University
Tai-Ping Liu (劉太平): Professor Emeritus of Mathematics, Stanford University
Sun-Yung Alice Chang (張聖容): Professor of Mathematics at Princeton University, member of the US National Academy of Sciences
Fan Chung (金芳蓉): Professor of Mathematics, the University of California, San Diego
C. F. Jeff Wu (吳建福): Coca-Cola Chair in Engineering Statistics and Professor in the H. Milton School of Industrial and Systems Engineering at Georgia Tech
Ching-Li Chai (翟敬立): Professor of Mathematics, University of Pennsylvania
Chang-Shou Lin (林長壽): mathematician, Academician of Academia Sinica
Chen-Yu Chi (齊震宇): Professor of Mathematics, NTU
Shen Chun-shan(沈君山): physicist, former President of National Tsing Hua University in Taiwan, politician, writer, Go player, bridge player
Leroy Chang(張立綱): physicist, member of the US National Academy of Sciences, Academician of Academia Sinica
Yuen-Ron Shen(沈元壤): physicist, member of the US National Academy of Sciences
Chi-Yuan Lu(盧志遠): physicist, entrepreneur, Fellow of the National Academy of Inventors, Academician of Academia Sinica
Nai-Chang Yeh(葉乃裳): physicist, Professor of Physics at Caltech
Chu, Kwo-Ray(朱國瑞): physicist, Academician of Academia Sinica
Louis Lee(李羅權): space physicist, member of the US National Academy of Engineering
Larry Hsien Ping Lang (郎咸平): Chair professor of finance at The Chinese University of Hong Kong
Ruey-Shiung Lin (林瑞雄): Professor Emeritus of Public health, National Taiwan University
Jiun-Huei Proty Wu: physics professor and Deputy Vice President for International Affairs, National Taiwan University
Vincent Chang: President and Vice-Chancellor of BRAC University
Wen Chi Chen (陳文琦): president and CEO of VIA Technologies
Min H. Kao (高民環): co-founder of Garmin Corporation, the GPS manufacturer
Barry Lam: (林百里): co-maker of the first computer in Taiwan, founder and chair of Quanta Computer
John Shen: executive of Globalization Services, IBM China Development Laboratory
Rick Tsai (蔡力行): president and CEO of Taiwan Semiconductor Manufacturing Company
Wu-Yi Hsiang (項武義): Professor of Mathematics, Hong Kong University of Science and Technology; Professor Emeritus of Mathematics, University of California, Berkeley
Benjamin Hsiao (BS, Chemical Engineering 1980) : Chief Research Officer and Vice-President for Research at Stony Brook University, Fellow of the American Physical Society, Fellow of the American Chemical Society, Fellow of the American Association for the Advancement of Science
Chun-Hway Hsueh: ISI high-cited researcher in materials science; Distinguished R&D Staff, Metals & Ceramics Division, Oak Ridge National Laboratory
Jin Au Kong (孔金甌): Professor of Electrical Engineering, Massachusetts Institute of Technology
Lee Si-Chen (李嗣涔): semiconductor researcher; IEEE Fellow, 2002; Professor of Electrical Engineering, National Taiwan University; former President of NTU 
Winnie Li (李文卿): Professor of Mathematics at Pennsylvania State University, Chern Prize (ICCM) recipient
Chang-Shou Lin (林長壽): Director, Taida Institute of Mathematical Sciences (TIMS), Fellow of Academia Sinica
Ching-Liang Lin (Chinese: 林清凉; 1931–2019): Professor of Physics, National Taiwan University
Tai-Ping Liu (劉太平): Director, Institute of Mathematics, Academia Sinica
Ho-Kwang Mao (毛河光): Balzan Prize, 2005; Gregori Aminoff Prize, 2005; Roebling Medal, 2005; Staff, Geophysical Laboratory, Carnegie Institution of Washington
Chiang-Chung Mei (梅強中): Professor of Civil and Environmental Engineering, Massachusetts Institute of Technology
Teresa H. Meng(孟懷縈): Reid Weaver Dennis Professor of Electrical Engineering, Stanford University; Founder of Atheros Communications, Inc.
Shen-su Sun (孫賢鉥): geochemist
Simon Min Sze (施敏): pioneer in MOSFET; IEEE J J Ebers Award, 1991
Yu-Chong Tai (戴聿昌): pioneer in microelectromechanical system (MEMS); Professor of Electrical Engineering, California Institute of Technology
Chenming Calvin Hu (胡正明):pioneer in FinFET; Distinguished Professor Emeritus in the electronic engineering and computer science department of the University of California, Berkeley.
Kuan-Chong Ting : Professor and Head, Department of Agricultural and Biological Engineering, University of Illinois, Urbana-Champaign
Tsay Ting-kuei (蔡丁貴), Professor of Civil Engineering, National Taiwan University since 1990
Chin-Lung Wang (王金龍): National Endowed Chair Professor and Professor of Mathematics, National Taiwan University
Weng I. Wang (王文一): Professor of Electrical Engineering, Columbia University
C.F. Jeff Wu (吳建福): Coca-Cola Chair in Engineering Statistics, Georgia Institute of Technology; Member, National Academy of Engineering, USA
Horng-Tzer Yau (姚鴻澤): MacArthur Fellowship, 2000; Professor of Mathematics, Harvard University
Nai-Chang Yeh (葉乃裳): Professor of Physics, California Institute of Technology

Life sciences
Chuan-Chiung Chang (張傳烱): co-discoverer of bungarotoxin; Professor Emeritus of Pharmacology, National Taiwan University
Ding-Shinn Chen, M.D. (陳定信): authority on hepatitis B and hepatocellular carcinoma; Dean, NTU College of Medicine; Foreign Member, National Academy of Sciences, USA
Lan-Bo Chen (陳良博): Professor of Pathology, Harvard Medical School
Pei-Jer Chen, M.D. (陳培哲): authority on hepatitis D virus; Howard Hughes Medical Institute International Research Scholar; Professor of Medicine, NTU
Wei-Jao Chen, M.D. (陳維昭): President, NTU, 1993–2005; pioneer in surgical separation of ischiopagus tripus conjoined twins
Yuan-Tsong Chen, M.D. (陳垣崇): inventor of Myozyme, the first EMEA- and U.S. Food and Drug Administration-approved treatment for Pompe disease (approved in 2006); Director, Institute of Biomedical Sciences, Academia Sinica; former Chief and professor, the Pediatrics Division of Medical Genetics, Duke University Medical Center
Yao-Tseng Chen, M.D.: Professor of Pathology and Laboratory Medicine, Weill Cornell Medical College
Yu-Ray Chen, M.D. (陳昱瑞): President, International Society of Craniofacial Surgery, 1999–2000
Shu Chien, M.D. (錢煦): University Professor, University of California; President, the American Physiological Society, 1990–1; President Elect, the Biomedical Engineering Society, USA, 2005-6
Tuan-Hua David Ho (賀端華): ISI (Institute for Scientific Information) highly cited researcher in plant and animal science; UNESCO Professorship, 2004; Director and Distinguished Research Fellow, Institute of Botany, Academia Sinica, 2003–2008, Currently a Professor in the Biology Department Washington University in St. Louis.
Fushih Pan, PhD: Plastic Surgeon, Developer of the MIRA Procedure
Ru-Chih Chow Huang (黃周汝吉): American Women in Science, 1985; Professor of Biology, Johns Hopkins University
Tao-shih Hsieh (謝道時): Professor of Biochemistry, Duke University Medical Center
Su-Ming Hsu, M.D. (許世明): ISI highly cited researcher in clinical medicine (cited more than 10,000 times between 1981 and 1992); Professor of Pathology, NTU
Lily Y. Jan (葉公杼): Howard Hughes Medical Institute investigator, Professor of Physiology and Biophysics, University of California, San Francisco
Yuh Nung Jan (詹裕農): Howard Hughes Medical Institute investigator, Professor of Molecular Physiology, University of California, San Francisco
Selina Chen-Kiang: Professor of Microbiology and Immunology, Professor of Pathology and Laboratory Medicine, Weill Cornell Medical College
 George Kuo, Co-discoverer of Hepatitis C
Michael M. C. Lai, M.D. (賴明詔): President, National Cheng Kung University, 2007–2011; Vice President, Academia Sinica, 2003–2007; Distinguished Professor of Molecular Microbiology and Immunology, University of Southern California; Howard Hughes Medical Institute Investigator, 1990–2003
Chen-Yuan Lee, M.D. (李鎮源): co-discoverer of bungarotoxin; Redi Award, 1976; Former President, International Society on Toxinology
Tun-Hou Lee (李惇厚): Professor of Virology, Harvard School of Public Health
Ching-Hon Pui, M.D.: Chair, Department of Oncology, St. Jude Children's Research Hospital; ISI highly cited researcher in clinical medicine
Vivian E. Shih, M.D.: Professor of Neurology, Harvard Medical School
Ming T. Tsuang, M.D. (莊明哲): University Professor, University of California; Director, Institute of Behavioral Genomics, University of California, San Diego; Director, Harvard Institute of Psychiatric Epidemiology and Genetics
Ching-Chung Wang (王正中): Professor of Chemistry and Pharmaceutical Chemistry, University of California, San Francisco
James C. Wang (王倬): discoverer of topoisomerase; Chair (1983–1985) and Professor (1977–2005), Department of Molecular and Cellular Biology, Harvard University
Tzyy Choou Wu, M.D.: Professor of Pathology, Professor of Oncology, and Professor of Obstetrics and Gynecology, Johns Hopkins Medical Institutions; Professor of Molecular Microbiology and Immunology, Johns Hopkins University
Jang Yen Wu (吳政彥): ISI highly cited researcher in neuroscience; Member, American Academy of Arts and Sciences; Senior Schmidt Fellow, Department of Biomedical Science, Florida Atlantic University
Fun-Sun Frank Yao, M.D.: Professor of Clinical Anesthesiology, Weill Cornell Medical College
Tsay Yi-fang: Distinguished fellow at Academia Sinica's Institute of Molecular Biology

Politics
Tsai Ing-wen (蔡英文): President of Republic of China (Taiwan), 2016-
Ma Ying-jeou (馬英九): President of Republic of China (Taiwan), 2008–2016; 
Chen Shui-bian (陳水扁): President of Republic of China (Taiwan), 2000–2008; lawyer 
Lee Teng-hui (李登輝): President of Republic of China (Taiwan), 1988–2000; agricultural economist
Lai Ching-te (賴清德), M.D.: Vice President of Republic of China (Taiwan), 2020–
Wu Den-yih (吳敦義): Vice President of Republic of China (Taiwan), 2012–2016
Lu, Annette (呂秀蓮): feminist, Vice President of Republic of China (Taiwan), 2000–2008
Lien Chan (連戰): Vice President of Republic of China (Taiwan), 1996–2000
Su Tseng-chang (蘇貞昌): Premier of Republic of China (Taiwan)
Chang Shan-cheng (張善政): engineer, Premier of Republic of China (Taiwan), 2016-2016
Sean Chen (陳冲): Premier of Republic of China (Taiwan), 2012-2013; banker
Frank Hsieh (謝長廷): Representative, Taipei Economic and Cultural Representative Office in Japan; Premier of Republic of China (Taiwan), 2005–2006
Eric Chu Li-luan (朱立倫): Vice Premier of Republic of China (Taiwan), 2009-2010
HSU, Tzong-Li (許宗力): Chief Justice and President of Judicial Yuan; Professor, Department of Law, National Taiwan University
Lin Yang-kang (林洋港): Chief Justice and President of Judicial Yuan, R.O.C., 1987–1994
Chang Po-ya (張博雅), M.P.H.: President of Control Yuan, 2014–2020; Minister of Health, 1979–1986
Fredrick Chien (錢復): diplomat, Minister of Foreign Affairs, R.O.C., 1990-1996; President of Control Yuan 1999–2005
General Chen Chao-min, M.B.A. (陳肇敏): Minister of National Defense
Chen Ding-nan (陳定南): Minister of Justice, 2000–2005
Lee, Yung-San (李庸三): economist, Minister of Finance, 2002–2002
Huang Kuo-chang (黃國昌): lawyer, social activist, legislator
Chen, Sisy (陳文茜): writer, talk show host
Chang Chau-hsiung, M.D. (張昭雄): Vice-chair of People First Party, 2000–, 1st President of Chang Gung University
Joe Hung (洪健昭): journalist (Central News Agency), translator and diplomat, Representative of Taiwan to Italy, 1993–2000 
Kao Chia-yu (高嘉瑜): Councillor of the 11th to 13th Taipei City Council; 14th President of NTU Student Association

Lin Yi-hsiung (林義雄): chairman, Democratic Progressive Party, 1998–2000

Li Ao (李敖): A writer, social commentator, historian, independent scholar and politician in the Republic of China (Taiwan).
Peng Ming-min (彭明敏): former Chair and professor, Department of Political Science, NTU; political activist for Taiwan independence

Shen Fu-hsiung, M.D. (沈富雄): Member, Legislative Yuan, R.O.C., 1992–2004; former Associate Professor, University of Washington, Seattle; former Director, Hemodialysis Unit, Seattle Veterans Administration Hospital

Chen Changwen: president of Red Cross Society of the Republic of China and the secretary of Straits Exchange Foundation.

Arts, Humanities and Social Sciences
Russell Leong: artist; Professor of English and Asian-American Studies, University of California, Los Angeles

Sun Kang-i (孫康宜): Malcolm G. Chace '56 Professor of East Asian Languages and Literature, Yale University (1966-68 Graduate Institute of Foreign Languages, completed all the course requirements except for the M.A. thesis)
David Schaberg: Professor, Department of Asian Languages & Cultures, University of California, Los Angeles (1986-1988 Elective Student, Dept. of Chinese Literature)

Lao Sze-kwang (勞思光): philosopher; Academician of Academia Sinica (B.A. Philosophy 1952)
Charles Wei-hsun Fu (傅偉勳): Professor of Religion, Temple University; founding faculty member of Fo Guang University (B.A. Philosophy)
Li Yih-yuan (李亦園): Academician of Academia Sinica; Professor, Dept. of Anthropology, NTU (B.A. Anthropology 1953)
Kwang-chih Chang (張光直): pioneer in Chinese archaeology in the US; Vice President of Academia Sinica; member of the US National Academy of Sciences; Professor of Anthropology, Harvard University (B.A. Anthropology 1954)
Chen Chi-nan (陳其南): Professor, National Taipei University of Arts; former Director of National Palace Museum; former Minister of Council for Cultural Affairs (M.A. Anthropology 1975)
Pang-hsin Ting (丁邦新): Professor Emeritus of Chinese Linguistics, University of California, Berkeley; Academician of Academia Sinica (B.A. Chinese, 1959; M.A. Chinese 1963)
Hsu James C.H. (許進雄): philologist at Royal Ontario Museum, Toronto
Cho-yun Hsu (許倬雲): Academician of Academia Sinica; Professor Emeritus of History and Sociology, University of Pittsburgh (B.A. History 1953; M.A. History 1956)
Liu Ts'ui-jung (劉翠溶): Academician and former Vice President of Academia Sinica (B.A. History 1953; M.A. History 1956)
Jing-shen Tao (陶晉生): Academician of Academia Sinica; Professor Emeritus of Chinese history, University of Arizona (B.A. History 1956; M.A. History 1959)
Tu Cheng-sheng (杜正勝): Academician of Academia Sinica; former Minister of Education; former Director of National Palace Museum (B.A. History 1970; M.A. History 1974)
Shih Shou-chien (石守謙): Distinguished Research Fellow, Institute of History and Philology, Academia Sinica; Academician of Academia Sinica; former Director of National Palace Museum (B.A. History 1973, M.A. History 1977)
Chin-Shing Huang (黃進興): Academician and Vice President of Academia Sinica (B.A. History 1973; M.A. History 1975)
Wu Mi-cha  (吳密察): Director of National Palace Museum (B.A. History 1978)
Wen-hsin Yeh (葉文心): Richard H. and Laurie C. Morrison Chair Professor, Department of History, University of California, Berkeley (B.A. History)
Cheng-hua Wang (王正華): Associate Professor of Art and Archaeology, Princeton University (B.A. History)
Hui-shu Lee (李慧漱): Professor of Chinese Art at University of California, Los Angeles (B.A. History)
Roel Sterckx: Joseph Needham Professor of Chinese History, Science and Civilization at the University of Cambridge and Fellow of Clare College
Yu-Kung Kao (高友工): Professor Emeritus of East Asian Studies at Princeton University (B.A. Chinese 1951)
Wai-lim Yip (葉維廉): poet; Professor Emeritus of Chinese and Comparative Literature at University of California, San Diego (B.A. Foreign Languages and Literature)
Leo Ou-fan Lee (李歐梵): Professor Emeritus of Chinese Literature, Harvard University; Academician of Academia Sinica (B.A. Foreign Languages and Literature 1961)
Kuo-Ch'ing Tu (杜國清): poet, Professor Emeritus of East Asian Languages and Culture Studies (B.A. Foreign Languages and Literature)
Chen, Fang-ming (陳芳明): literary historian, democratic activist (M.A. History 1973)
Sung-Sheng (Yvonne) Chang (張誦聖): Professor, Department Asian Studies and the Program in Comparative Literature, University of Texas at Austin (B.A. Foreign Languages and Literature 1973)
David Der-wei Wang (王德威): literary critic and historian, Edward C. Henderson Professor of East Asian Languages and Cultures, Harvard University, Academician of Academia Sinica (B.A. Foreign Languages and Literature 1976)
Michelle Yeh (奚密): Distinguished Professor of Chinese, University of California, Davis (B.A. Foreign Languages and Literature)
I, Lo-fen (衣若芬): Associate Professor, Department of Chinese Literature, Nanyang Technological University (B.A. Chinese, M.A. 1989, PhD. 1994)
Ou, Li-Chuan (歐麗娟): Redologist, Professor of Chinese Literature at NTU (B.A. History, M.A. Chinese 1990, PhD. Chinese 1996)
Yu Kwang-chung (余光中): poet, essayist, critic, translator, Professor of Foreign Languages and Literature at NSYSU (B.A. Foreign Languages and Literature 1954)
Lin Wenyue (林文月): essayist, translator of Japanese literature including The Tale of Genji; Professor Emerita, Dept. of Chinese Literature, NTU  (B.A. Chinese, M.A. 1958)
Pai Hsien-yung (白先勇): National Awards for Arts winning novelist, Professor Emeritus at University of California, Santa Barbara  (B.A. Foreign Languages and Literature 1961)
Cheng Ch'ing-wen (鄭清文): National Awards for Arts winning novelist; banker
Wang Wen-hsing (王文興): National Awards for Arts winning novelist, Professor of Foreign Languages and Literature at NTU  (B.A. Foreign Languages and Literature 1961)
Chen Ruoxi (陳若曦): National Awards for Arts winning novelist (B.A. Foreign Languages and Literature 1961)
Chu Tʽien-hsin (朱天心): novelist  (B.A. History)
Ping Lu (平路): novelist (B.A. Psychology)
Yang Fu-min (楊富閔): novelist 
Li Kotomi (李琴峰): Akutagawa Prize winning fiction writer  (B.A. Japanese & Chinese)
Angela Yang: multicultural and outreach services librarian, President of Chinese American Librarians Association from 1992 to 1993
Lü Shao-chia (呂紹嘉): orchestra and opera conductor (B.A. Psychology 1983)
Lucie Cheng (成露茜): sociologist, first permanent director of the Asian American Studies Center at the University of California, Los Angeles
Huei-Ying Kuo (郭慧英): Associate Research Professor, Department of Sociology, Johns Hopkins University (B.A. Sociology 1993, M.A. 1997)
Hsiao-ting Lin (林孝庭): Research Fellow and Curator of East Asian Collection at the Hoover Institution, Stanford University
Jiang Yi-huah (江宜樺): Bauhinia Chair Professor of Institute of Strategic and International Affairs at National Chung Cheng University, former Premier  of Republic of China
George C. Tiao (刁錦寰): W. Allen Wallis Professor of Econometrics and Statistics Emeritus, University of Chicago
Cyrus Chu(朱敬一): economist, member of the US National Academy of Sciences, Academician of Academia Sinica, former Ambassador and Permanent Representative of the Separate Customs Territory of Taiwan, Penghu, Kinmen and Matsu to the World Trade Organization
Jang Show-ling (鄭秀玲): economist, former legislator

Business and Financial Sectors
Felice Chen: Former managing director and Co-Head of Investment Banking for UBS Investment Bank in Taipei
Robert Chiu: managing director, Head of Telecommunications, Media and Technology investment banking at Nomura
John Chou (周鴻成): Chief Actuary and Senior Vice President of Liberty National Life Insurance Co., the founding division of Torchmark Corporation
Koo Chen-fu (辜振甫): Former Chairman of the Koos Group of companies
T.J. Huang (黃宗仁): Founder and Managing Partner of AsiaVest Partners, one of the leading venture capital firms in the Far East
Steven Hung: Chairman of Waterland Financial Holding Co., Ltd.
Fred Pai: Chairman of Central Insurance Co. and brother of Wayne Pai, founder and former chairman of Polaris Financial Group
Chang Yi Wang: Chairperson and CEO of the United Biomedical, Inc. (UBI) Group of companies.
Ye-Chin Chiou(邱月琴): Chairperson, First Commercial Bank
Grace M.L. Jeng(鄭美玲): CEO, First Commercial Bank
Chang, Yun-Peng(張雲鵬): President, Hua Nan Commercial Bank

Entertainment
Wakin Chau (周華健): (B.S., Mathematics) singer
Alec Su (蘇有朋): (non-graduate, Mechanical Engineering) singer, actor 
Wen Shang-yi (怪獸 溫尚翊): (non-graduate, sociology) guitarist and band leader of Mayday 
William Wei (韋禮安): (B.A., Foreign Languages & Literature) singer
Tsai Lan-chin (蔡藍欽): (non-graduate, Mechanical Engineering) singer and songwriter
Chen Kuangyi (陳匡怡): actress and model
Smire Weng (翁滋蔓): TV show host
Brian Tseng (曾博恩): you-tuber, talk show host

References 

Taiwan education-related lists
Lists of Taiwanese people